The Astana Grand Mosque is a mosque in Astana, Kazakhstan. It is the largest mosque in Central Asia and one of the largest in the world.

The main dome of the mosque is the largest of its kind in the world.

The height of the dome is almost 83.2 meters with a diameter of 62 meters. The surrounding four minarets are 130 meters and are made of five parts to symbolize the five pillars of Islam - faith, prayer, fasting, zakat and pilgrimage. One of the towers in the left wing has been opened to the public. Guests can take an elevator up and admire the view of the city.

The entrance door of the mosque is considered one of the tallest wooden doors in the world, standing at 12.4 meters with a weight of one and a half tons. The material is made of hard iroko wood, which grows in tropical Africa. The doors are decorated with Kazakh patterns and the outer walls with white Arabic script on a blue background.

The interior doors of the mosque are 12 meters high and the windows are made of handmade stained glass with colorful ornaments.

The walls of the mosque and the inside of the dome are decorated with colorful patterns, verses from the Koran and prayers. The Arabic calligraphy was illustrated by Kazakh master Asylbek Baizakuly.

The wall on the side facing the qibla is inscribed with the 99 names of Allah, illuminated with golden light from within. The mosaic wall is 100 meters long and 22.4 meters high and consists of 25 million glasses of different colors.

The big hall and the women's prayer zone are fully covered with Kazakh ornamental carpets. The total area of the carpet is 15,525 square meters, making it the largest handmade carpet in the world.

See also
 Islam in Kazakhstan

References

2022 establishments in Kazakhstan
Mosques completed in 2022
Mosques in Astana